Mark Savage (born 17 September 1962) is a US-based Australian film and television director, screenwriter, and film producer specializing in thrillers, horror, crime, cult, action and exploitation-themed films.  He is influenced by European and Asian genre cinema, and has written critical reviews and articles for the Herald Sun, Asian Cult Cinema', Filmnet and Fatal Visions.

Savage wrote, produced and directed his first feature  Marauaders in 1986, since then genre entries have included Sensitive New Age Killer (2000), Trail of Passion (2003), Defenceless (2004), Kinderplay (2013), FertIsle (2015), Stressed To Kill (2016) and Purgatory Road (2017)

During 2017 and 2018 Purgatory Road was released in the United States and Australia and in 2019 on DVD and Blu-ray in Canada and America. In 2020 the movie was scheduled for showing in the UK on channels including Virgin Media and Sky Store. also in Ireland.
The film was acclaimed in reviews and at the Melbourne Underground Film Festival, and the original score by Glen Gabriel received a Hollywood Music in Media Awards nomination.

In 2020 Painkiller was completed, starring Michael Paré and Bill Oberst Jr.

References

External links

PopMatters Primal Screens: Mark Savage and Australian Independent Cinema
This Week on Creators Studio: Film Director Mark Savage
IMDb Purgatory Road

Australian film directors
Australian screenwriters
Australian film producers
1962 births
Living people